The Belfast International Airport Constabulary (BIAC) is a small, specialised police force responsible for providing policing to the Belfast International Airport in Aldergrove, Northern Ireland. Officers employed by the force as empowered to act as Constables in accordance with the Airport (Northern Ireland) Order 1994 whilst on land owned or controlled by the airport. The Belfast International Airport Constabulary is the last remaining privately funded airport police force in the United Kingdom, however airport forces still operate in the Republic of Ireland and the Isle of Man.

Officers of the Belfast International Airport Constabulary are employees of the airport authority. Like all police agencies operating in Northern Ireland, they are subject to oversight from the Police Ombudsman for Northern Ireland. Any serious incidents taking place at the airport are automatically passed to the local territorial police force, the Police Service of Northern Ireland.

Weapons and equipment
Officers are equipped with Glock 17 pistols, identical to those issued by the Police Service of Northern Ireland and Belfast Harbour Police. The force also issues extendable batons, PAVA spray, rigid handcuffs and body worn video cameras.

See also
Airport policing in the United Kingdom
List of law enforcement agencies in the United Kingdom, Crown Dependencies and British Overseas Territories
Law enforcement in the United Kingdom

References

1994 establishments in Northern Ireland
Organizations established in 1994
Police forces of Northern Ireland
Organisations based in Belfast
Transport in Belfast
Airport police forces of the United Kingdom